Hing Man is one of the 35 constituencies in the Eastern District.

The constituency returns one district councillor to the Eastern District Council, with an election every four years. The seat is currently held by Tse Miu-yee.

Hing Man loosely based on Hing Man Estate and Hing Wah (I) Estate in Chai Wan with estimated population of 14,601.

Councillors represented

Election results

2010s

References

Chai Wan
Constituencies of Hong Kong
Constituencies of Eastern District Council
1994 establishments in Hong Kong
Constituencies established in 1994